No. 8 Group was a Royal Air Force group which existed during the final year of the First World War and during the Second World War.

First World War
No. 8 Group was formed in April 1918 as a training unit and designated 8 Group (Training). It remained in this function throughout the rest of the war and was disbanded in May 1919.

Second World War

First formation
The Group was re-established as No 8 (Bomber) Group on 1 September 1941 only to be disbanded around five months later on 28 January 1942.

Reformation of Group 8
8 Group was re-constituted when Bomber Command's Pathfinder Force was renamed No. 8 (Pathfinder Force) Group on 8 January 1943. The group consisted of specialist squadrons that marked targets for the main attacks of Bomber Command aircraft. The Force, which had been formed in August 1942 with five Squadrons from the existing Bomber Command Groups  flying a mix of Short Stirlings, Handley Page Halifaxes, Avro Lancasters and Vickers Wellingtons. When new aircraft, such as the de Havilland Mosquito became available, 8 Group got the first ones. Its aircraft used navigation aids such as Gee, H2S and Oboe to find the targets of attack more accurately than the main force on its own could. Initially five squadrons, 8 Group ultimately grew to a strength of 19 squadrons. 

No. 8 Group was also responsible for the Light Night Striking Force, equipped with Mosquito bombers and used for harassing raids on Germany. It was disbanded  on 15 December 1945, though its badge and motto ("We Guide to Strike") were subsequently authorized on 11 March 1953. While the majority of Pathfinder squadrons and personnel were from the Royal Air Force, the group also included many from the air forces of other Commonwealth countries. The PFF flew a total of 50,490 individual sorties against some 3,440 targets. The cost in human lives was grievous. At least 3,727 members were killed on operations and 675 aircraft lost.

Structure
 February 1943
 No. 7 Squadron RAF at RAF Oakington with the Short Stirling I
 No. 35 Squadron RAF at RAF Graveley with the Handley Page Halifax II
 No. 83 Squadron RAF at RAF Wyton with the Avro Lancaster I, III
 No. 109 Squadron RAF at RAF Wyton with the de Havilland Mosquito IV
 No. 156 Squadron RAF at RAF Warboys with the Vickers Wellington III & Avro Lancaster I, III

 February 1944
 No. 7 Squadron RAF at RAF Oakington with the Avro Lancaster I, III
 No. 35 Squadron RAF at RAF Graveley with the Handley Page Halifax III
 No. 83 Squadron RAF at RAF Wyton with the Avro Lancaster I, III
 No. 105 Squadron RAF at RAF Marham with the de Havilland Mosquito IV, IX
 No. 109 Squadron RAF at RAF Marham with the de Havilland Mosquito IV, IX
 No. 139 Squadron RAF at RAF Upwood with the de Havilland Mosquito IV, IX, XVI, XX
 No. 156 Squadron RAF at RAF Warboys with the Avro Lancaster I, III
 No. 405 Squadron RCAF at RAF Gransden Lodge with the Avro Lancaster I, III
 No. 627 Squadron RAF at RAF Oakington with the de Havilland Mosquito IV
 No. 692 Squadron RAF at RAF Graveley with the de Havilland Mosquito IV

22 March 1945
 No. 7 Squadron RAF at RAF Oakington with the Avro Lancaster I, III
 No. 35 Squadron RAF at RAF Graveley with the Avro Lancaster I, III
 No. 105 Squadron RAF at RAF Bourn with the de Havilland Mosquito IX, XVI
 No. 109 Squadron RAF at RAF Little Staughton with the de Havilland Mosquito IX, XVI
 No. 128 Squadron RAF at RAF Wyton with the de Havilland Mosquito XVI
 No. 139 Squadron RAF at RAF Upwood with the de Havilland Mosquito IX, XVI, XX, XXV
 No. 142 Squadron RAF at RAF Gransden Lodge with the de Havilland Mosquito XXV
 No. 156 Squadron RAF at RAF Upwood with the Avro Lancaster I, III
 No. 162 Squadron RAF at RAF Bourn with the de Havilland Mosquito XX, XXV
 No. 163 Squadron RAF at RAF Wyton with the de Havilland Mosquito XXV
 No. 405 Squadron RCAF at RAF Gransden Lodge with the Avro Lancaster I, III
 No. 571 Squadron RAF at RAF Oakington with the de Havilland Mosquito XVI
 No. 582 Squadron RAF at RAF Little Staughton with the Avro Lancaster I, III
 No. 608 Squadron RAF at RAF Downham Market with the de Havilland Mosquito XX, XXV
 No. 635 Squadron RAF at RAF Downham Market with the Avro Lancaster I, III
 No. 692 Squadron RAF at RAF Graveley with the de Havilland Mosquito XVI

Headquarters

August 1942 - RAF Wyton
June 1943 - Castle Hill House, Huntingdon

Air Officer Commanding

1918 to 1919
1918 Brigadier-General John Miles Steel

1941 to 1942
8 September 1941 Air Commodore Francis Fogarty
December 1941 Air Vice-Marshal Donald Stevenson (appointment not certain)

1943 to 1945
13 January 1943 Air Vice-Marshal Don  Bennett
21 May 1945 Air Vice-Marshal John Whitley

See also
 List of Royal Air Force groups

References

Citations

Bibliography

External links
 Air of Authority - A History of RAF Organisation - Groups 1 - 9

008
Military units and formations established in 1918
Military units and formations in Huntingdonshire
Military units and formations of the Royal Air Force in World War I
Military units and formations of the Royal Air Force in World War II
1918 establishments in the United Kingdom